Zheng Baozhu is a Paralympian athlete from the People's Republic of China competing mainly in category F42/F46 throwing events.

She competed in the 2004 Summer Paralympics in Athens, Greece. There she won a gold medal in both the women's shot put F42/F46 event and the women's discus throw F42/F46 event.  She also marginally missed out on a medal in the women's F42/F46 javelin throw, missing third place by just 4 points.

Four years later she returned to compete in her home country in the 2008 Summer Paralympics in Beijing, China. There she retained her gold medal in the women's shot put F42/F46 event, she won a bronze medal in the F42/F46 discus throw and again finished fourth in the F42/F46 javelin throw.

External links
 

Paralympic athletes of China
Athletes (track and field) at the 2008 Summer Paralympics
Paralympic gold medalists for China
Paralympic silver medalists for China
Paralympic bronze medalists for China
Living people
Chinese female discus throwers
Chinese female shot putters
Chinese female javelin throwers
Medalists at the 2004 Summer Paralympics
Medalists at the 2008 Summer Paralympics
Year of birth missing (living people)
Paralympic medalists in athletics (track and field)
21st-century Chinese women